Ikechukwu "Ike" Ufomadu is an American comedian, actor, and writer. In 2022, he was nominated for a Primetime Emmy Award for Outstanding Actor in a Short Form Series for his work on Cake.

Career

Ufomadu studied drama at the Tisch School of the Arts of New York University, where he graduated with a Bachelor of Fine Arts in 2008.

Ufomadu has performed comedy in shows throughout New York City. His deadpan style has been described as "so slow, so dry and so demanding of your attention". He often puts on, in his words, an "old-school entertainment type" persona. In 2015, he hosted Ike at Night, a live-theater series in the style of talk shows like The Tonight Show Starring Johnny Carson. It featured a comedic opening monologue and guest interviews with an "emphasis on politics and multicultural issues". Later "Ike" shows included Nightcap by Ike, Ike's Wonderful World of Leisure, Ike by Chance, and Ike for the Holidays, several of which were staged at Joe's Pub in Manhattan.

In 2018, Ufomadu acted in Clare Barron's off-Broadway play Dance Nation; he was part of the original cast that received a Drama Desk Award for Outstanding Ensemble. Ben Brantley of The New York Times commended Ufomadu's "appealing, low-key presence" in the female-led play.

Inspector Ike, a low-budget detective comedy film inspired by Columbo, was released in 2020. Paste magazine wrote that the title character was "skillfully played straight-faced" by Ufomadu, who co-wrote the film with director Graham Mason. Ufomadu voiced Dr. Ike Bloom on Tooning Out the News, an animated satirical news show produced by Stephen Colbert, beginning in 2020.

Ufomadu and Mason contributed the recurring segment "Words with Ike" to the fifth season of FXX's short-form comedy anthology Cake in 2021. Vulture wrote that the vocabulary-exploring segment "drives home a feeling that Ufomadu loves comedy because he loves language". For "Words with Ike", Ufomadu was nominated for a Primetime Emmy Award for Outstanding Actor in a Short Form Comedy or Drama Series at the 74th Primetime Emmy Awards.

The comedian appeared on six episodes of Showtime's talk show Ziwe in 2022. Vulture included Ufomadu on its list of 24 "Comedians You Should and Will Know in 2022".

References

External links

Living people
21st-century American comedians
American male comedians
Year of birth missing (living people)